The Qatar national futsal team represents Qatar in international futsal competitions. It has only qualified for three AFC Futsal Championships.

Tournaments

FIFA Futsal World Cup

AFC Futsal Championship

Futsal at the Asian Indoor and Martial Arts Games
 2005 – Quarter-finals
 2007 – Round 1
 2009 – Did not enter
 2013 – Round 1

Grand Prix de Futsal
 2005 – Did not enter
 2006 – Did not enter
 2007 – Did not enter
 2008 – Did not enter
 2009 – Did not enter
 2010 – 16th place
 2011 – Did not enter
 2013 – Did not enter
 2014 – Did not enter
 2015 – Did not enter
 2016 – TBD

Arab Futsal Championship

GCC Futsal Cup

Results
http://old.futsalplanet.com/matches

2018 AFC Futsal Championship qualification

2020 AFC Futsal Championship qualification

10/10/2019 - Al Wakrah (QAT)
- Friendly Match
Qatar 	vs 	Palestine 	3 - 3 		-

08/10/2019 - Al Wakrah (QAT)
- Friendly Match
Qatar 	vs 	Palestine 	3 - 2 		-

06/10/2019 - Al Wakrah (QAT)
- Friendly Match
Qatar 	vs 	Palestine 	1 - 5 		-

26/04/2019 - Doha (QAT)
- Friendly Match
Qatar 	vs 	Lebanon 	4 - 5 		-

12/11/2017 - Bangkok (THA)
- AFC Asian Futsal Championship - Chinese Taipei 2018 (Q)
Qatar 	vs 	Lebanon 	1 - 3 		-

10/11/2017 - Bangkok (THA)
- AFC Asian Futsal Championship - Chinese Taipei 2018 (Q)
Jordan 	vs 	Qatar 	3 - 1 		-

15/10/2017 - Doha (QAT)
- Friendly Match
Qatar 	vs 	Malaysia 	4 - 5 		-

13/10/2017 - Doha (QAT)
- Friendly Match
Qatar 	vs 	Malaysia 	1 - 1 		-

15/02/2016 - Tashkent (UZB)
- AFC Asian Futsal Championship - Uzbekistan 2016 (FT)
Malaysia 	vs 	Qatar 	2 - 6 		-

13/02/2016 - Tashkent (UZB)
- AFC Asian Futsal Championship - Uzbekistan 2016 (FT)
Qatar 	vs 	Australia 	2 - 5 		-

11/02/2016 - Tashkent (UZB)
- AFC Asian Futsal Championship - Uzbekistan 2016 (FT)
Japan 	vs 	Qatar 	1 - 0 		-

22/01/2016 - Rio Maior (POR)
- Friendly Match
Portugal 	vs 	Qatar 	7 - 0 		-

16/12/2015 - Doha (QAT)
- Friendly Match
Qatar 	vs 	Malaysia 	4 - 3 		-

14/12/2015 - Doha (QAT)
- Friendly Match
Qatar 	vs 	Malaysia 	6 - 2 		-

09/12/2015 - Al Wakrah (QAT)
- Friendly Match
Qatar 	vs 	Uzbekistan 	2 - 3 		-

07/12/2015 - Al Wakrah (QAT)
- Friendly Match
Qatar 	vs 	Uzbekistan 	5 - 4 		-

03/10/2015 - Nilai (MLY)
- AFC Asian Futsal Championship - Uzbekistan 2016 (QT)
Iraq 	vs 	Qatar 	1 - 2 		-

02/10/2015 - Nilai (MLY)
- AFC Asian Futsal Championship - Uzbekistan 2016 (QT)
Qatar 	vs 	UAE 	2 - 1 		-

25/09/2015 - Bangkok (THA)
- Friendly Match
Bahrain 	vs 	Qatar 	1 - 2 		-

24/09/2015 - Bangkok (THA)
- Friendly Match
Thailand 	vs 	Qatar 	4 - 3 		-

18/03/2015 - Isa Town (BAH)
- Isa Town 2015 - GCC Futsal Championship
Kuwait 	vs 	Qatar 	5 - 2 		-

17/03/2015 - Isa Town (BAH)
- Isa Town 2015 - GCC Futsal Championship
Qatar 	vs 	UAE 	4 - 3 		-

15/03/2015 - Isa Town (BAH)
- Isa Town 2015 - GCC Futsal Championship
Qatar 	vs 	Kuwait 	2 - 4 		-

14/03/2015 - Isa Town (BAH)
- Isa Town 2015 - GCC Futsal Championship
UAE 	vs 	Qatar 	2 - 2 		-

12/03/2015 - Isa Town (BAH)
- Isa Town 2015 - GCC Futsal Championship
Bahrain 	vs 	Qatar 	0 - 2 		-

11/03/2015 - Isa Town (BAH)
- Isa Town 2015 - GCC Futsal Championship
Qatar 	vs 	Oman 	4 - 3 		-

10/03/2015 - Isa Town (BAH)
- Isa Town 2015 - GCC Futsal Championship
Qatar 	vs 	Saudi Arabia 	4 - 1 		-

08/06/2014 - Newcastle upon Tyne (ENG)
- Newcastle 2014
Cyprus 	vs 	Qatar 	0 - 0 		-

06/06/2014 - Newcastle upon Tyne (ENG)
- Newcastle 2014
England 	vs 	Qatar 	3 - 0 		-

05/06/2014 - Newcastle upon Tyne (ENG)
- Newcastle 2014
USA 	vs 	Qatar 	5 - 1 		-

12/12/2013 - Nilai (MLY)
- AFC Asian Futsal Championship - Vietnam 2014 (Q)
Iraq 	vs 	Qatar 	1 - 1 		-

11/12/2013 - Nilai (MLY)
- AFC Asian Futsal Championship - Vietnam 2014 (Q)
Qatar 	vs 	Kuwait 	1 - 4 		-

10/12/2013 - Nilai (MLY)
- AFC Asian Futsal Championship - Vietnam 2014 (Q)
Qatar 	vs 	Lebanon 	1 - 3 		-

09/12/2013 - Nilai (MLY)
- AFC Asian Futsal Championship - Vietnam 2014 (Q)
Saudi Arabia 	vs 	Qatar 	2 - 2 		-

03/12/2013 - Shah Alam (MLY)
- Friendly Match
Malaysia 	vs 	Qatar 	2 - 1 		-

29/11/2013 - Puchong (MLY)
- Friendly Match
Malaysia 	vs 	Qatar 	3 - 5 		-

26/10/2013 - Doha (QAT)
- Friendly Match
Qatar 	vs 	England 	6 - 6 		-

25/10/2013 - Doha (QAT)
- Friendly Match
Qatar 	vs 	England 	1 - 3 		-

30/09/2013 - Doha (QAT)
- Doha 2013 - GCC Futsal Championship
Qatar 	vs 	Kuwait 	1 - 5 		-

28/09/2013 - Doha (QAT)
- Doha 2013 - GCC Futsal Championship
Qatar 	vs 	Bahrain 	2 - 4 		-

27/09/2013 - Doha (QAT)
- Doha 2013 - GCC Futsal Championship
Qatar 	vs 	UAE 	8 - 1 		-

24/09/2013 - Doha (QAT)
- Doha 2013 - GCC Futsal Championship
Qatar 	vs 	Saudi Arabia 	3 - 3 		-

01/07/2013 - Incheon (KOR)
- Incheon 2013 - Men
Uzbekistan 	vs 	Qatar 	6 - 1 		-

29/06/2013 - Incheon (KOR)
- Incheon 2013 - Men
Qatar 	vs 	Afghanistan 	7 - 6 		-

22/05/2013 - Doha (QAT)
- Friendly Match
Qatar 	vs 	Lebanon 	1 - 3 		-

20/05/2013 - Doha (QAT)
- Friendly Match
Qatar 	vs 	Lebanon 	2 - 3 		-

27/05/2012 - Dubai (UAE)
- AFC Asian Futsal Championship - UAE 2012
Qatar 	vs 	Korea Republic 	6 - 3 		-

26/05/2012 - Dubai (UAE)
- AFC Asian Futsal Championship - UAE 2012
Qatar 	vs 	Iran 	0 - 8 		-

25/05/2012 - Dubai (UAE)
- AFC Asian Futsal Championship - UAE 2012
Australia 	vs 	Qatar 	3 - 1 		-

22/05/2012 - Dubai (UAE)
- Friendly Match
Lebanon 	vs 	Qatar 	4 - 2 		-

18/05/2012 - Sharjah (UAE)
- Friendly Match
UAE 	vs 	Qatar 	5 - 3 		-

15/02/2012 - Ariana (TUN)
- Arab Spring - Tunisia 2012
UAE 	vs 	Qatar 	3 - 0 		-

14/02/2012 - Ariana (TUN)
- Arab Spring - Tunisia 2012
Libya 	vs 	Qatar 	3 - 3 		-

11/02/2012 - La Goulette (TUN)
- Arab Spring - Tunisia 2012
Tunisia 	vs 	Qatar 	7 - 7 		-

16/12/2011 - Kuwait City (KUW)
- AFC Asian Futsal Championship - UAE 2012 (Q)
Qatar 	vs 	Kuwait 	2 - 2 		-

15/12/2011 - Kuwait City (KUW)
- AFC Asian Futsal Championship - UAE 2012 (Q)
Qatar 	vs 	Lebanon 	2 - 2 		-

13/12/2011 - Kuwait City (KUW)
- AFC Asian Futsal Championship - UAE 2012 (Q)
Kuwait 	vs 	Qatar 	1 - 2 		-

12/12/2011 - Kuwait City (KUW)
- AFC Asian Futsal Championship - UAE 2012 (Q)
Qatar 	vs 	Saudi Arabia 	6 - 5 		-

11/12/2011 - Kuwait City (KUW)
- AFC Asian Futsal Championship - UAE 2012 (Q)
Palestine 	vs 	Qatar 	1 - 18 		-

09/12/2011 - Kuwait City (KUW)
- AFC Asian Futsal Championship - UAE 2012 (Q)
Qatar 	vs 	Syria 	6 - 2 		-

10/11/2011 - Beirut (LEB)
- Friendly Match
Lebanon 	vs 	Qatar 	5 - 5 		-

09/11/2011 - Beirut (LEB)
- Friendly Match
Lebanon 	vs 	Qatar 	2 - 5 		-

05/11/2011 - Doha (QAT)
- Friendly Match
Qatar 	vs 	Vietnam 	3 - 0 		-

09/10/2011 - Hanoi (VIE)
- Hanoi 2011
Qatar 	vs 	China 	2 - 2 		-

08/10/2011 - Hanoi (VIE)
- Hanoi 2011
Qatar 	vs 	Vietnam 	4 - 2 		-

07/10/2011 - Hanoi (VIE)
- Hanoi 2011
Uzbekistan 	vs 	Qatar 	6 - 1 		-

12/04/2011 - Caspe (ESP)
- Friendly Match
Spain 	vs 	Qatar 	10 - 0 		-

11/04/2011 - Utebo/Zaragoza (ESP)
- Friendly Match
Spain 	vs 	Qatar 	9 - 0 		-

14/11/2010 - Hanoi (VIE)
- Hanoi 2010
Vietnam 	vs 	Qatar 	3 - 1 		-

12/11/2010 - Hanoi (VIE)
- Hanoi 2010
Chinese Taipei 	vs 	Qatar 	3 - 7 		-

23/10/2010 - Anápolis (BRA)
- Grand Prix 2010
Zambia 	vs 	Qatar 	6 - 3 		-

22/10/2010 - Anápolis (BRA)
- Grand Prix 2010
Romania 	vs 	Qatar 	4 - 1 		-

21/10/2010 - Anápolis (BRA)
- Grand Prix 2010
Russia 	vs 	Qatar 	9 - 2 		-

19/10/2010 - Anápolis (BRA)
- Grand Prix 2010
Qatar 	vs 	Argentina 	1 - 5 		-

18/10/2010 - Anápolis (BRA)
- Grand Prix 2010
Romania 	vs 	Qatar 	4 - 1 		-

17/10/2010 - Anápolis (BRA)
- Grand Prix 2010
Spain 	vs 	Qatar 	13 - 0 		-

18/10/2009 - Doha (QAT)
- AFC Asian Futsal Championship - Uzbekistan 2010 (Q)
Qatar 	vs 	Kuwait 	7 - 7 		-

17/10/2009 - Doha (QAT)
- AFC Asian Futsal Championship - Uzbekistan 2010 (Q)
Iraq 	vs 	Qatar 	4 - 0 		-

15/10/2009 - Doha (QAT)
- AFC Asian Futsal Championship - Uzbekistan 2010 (Q)
Lebanon 	vs 	Qatar 	8 - 3 		-

14/10/2009 - Doha (QAT)
- AFC Asian Futsal Championship - Uzbekistan 2010 (Q)
Qatar 	vs 	Bahrain 	4 - 3 		-

05/10/2009 - Doha (QAT)
- Friendly Match
Qatar 	vs 	Kuwait 	3 - 1 		-

30/09/2009 - Doha (QAT)
- Friendly Match
Qatar 	vs 	Kuwait 	3 - 3 		-

12/05/2009 - Doha (QAT)
- Friendly Match
Qatar 	vs 	Libya 	1 - 7 		-

11/05/2009 - Doha (QAT)
- Friendly Match
Qatar 	vs 	Libya 	0 - 8 		-

06/02/2009 - Cairo (EGY)
- Friendly Match
Egypt 	vs 	Qatar 	6 - 1 		-

04/02/2009 - Cairo (EGY)
- Friendly Match
Egypt 	vs 	Qatar 	7 - 4 		-

29/03/2008 - Shah Alam, Selangor (MLY)
- AFC Asian Futsal Championship - Thailand 2008 (Q)
Indonesia 	vs 	Qatar 	6 - 1 		-

28/03/2008 - Shah Alam, Selangor (MLY)
- AFC Asian Futsal Championship - Thailand 2008 (Q)
Kuwait 	vs 	Qatar 	2 - 1 		-

27/03/2008 - Shah Alam, Selangor (MLY)
- AFC Asian Futsal Championship - Thailand 2008 (Q)
Qatar 	vs 	Macau 	3 - 2 		-

26/03/2008 - Shah Alam, Selangor (MLY)
- AFC Asian Futsal Championship - Thailand 2008 (Q)
Qatar 	vs 	Brunei 	2 - 0 		-

30/10/2007 - RootDamages FasT here (MCO)
- Macau - Macau 2007 - Men
Qatar 	vs 	Tajikistan 	2 - 2 		-

29/10/2007 - RootDamages FasT here (MCO)
- Macau - Macau 2007 - Men
Qatar 	vs 	China 	1 - 4 		-

27/10/2007 - RootDamages FasT here (MCO)
- Macau - Macau 2007 - Men
Timor-Leste 	vs 	Qatar 	1 - 19 		-

26/10/2007 - RootDamages FasT here (MCO)
- Macau - Macau 2007 - Men
Kuwait 	vs 	Qatar 	0 - 3 		-

14/11/2005 - Bangkok (THA)
- Bangkok - Thailand 2005 - Men
Iran 	vs 	Qatar 	11 - 0 		-

12/11/2005 - Bangkok (THA)
- Bangkok - Thailand 2005 - Men
Qatar 	vs 	Uzbekistan 	0 - 15 		-

11/11/2005 - Bangkok (THA)
- Bangkok - Thailand 2005 - Men
Kyrgyzstan 	vs 	Qatar 	5 - 2 		-

31/05/2005 - Ho Chi Min City (VIE)
- Ho Chi Min City - Vietnam 2005
Palestine 	vs 	Qatar 	12 - 4 		-

30/05/2005 - Ho Chi Min City (VIE)
- Ho Chi Min City - Vietnam 2005
Guam 	vs 	Qatar 	4 - 14 		-

28/05/2005 - Ho Chi Min City (VIE)
- Ho Chi Min City - Vietnam 2005
Turkmenistan 	vs 	Qatar 	8 - 6 		-

26/05/2005 - Ho Chi Min City (VIE)
- Ho Chi Min City - Vietnam 2005
Qatar 	vs 	Chinese Taipei 	2 - 10 		-

25/05/2005 - Ho Chi Min City (VIE)
- Ho Chi Min City - Vietnam 2005
Qatar 	vs 	Tajikistan 	3 - 7 		-

23/05/2005 - Ho Chi Min City (VIE)
- Ho Chi Min City - Vietnam 2005
Korea Republic 	vs 	Qatar 	7 - 3 		-

Managerial history
 Eduardo Garcia Belda
 Flavio Do Amaral (July 2014-July 2015)
 Michel Stráž (Jan 2015–??) (CT)
 Tiago Polido (Aug 2015–)

References

Asian national futsal teams
Futsal